David John Pallett (born 8 February 1990)  is an English professional darts player playing in Professional Darts Corporation (PDC) events.

Career
In January 2013, Pallett entered PDC Q School and stood just one match from joining the tour in the second event, but lost 6–5 to Louis Blundell. However, after all four events had been played he had done enough through the Q School Order of Merit to earn a two-year PDC tour card. Pallett qualified for the first European Tour event of the year, the UK Masters and beat top 20 player Paul Nicholson 6–3 in the opening round before losing by a reverse of this scoreline to two-time world champion Adrian Lewis in the second round. He reached the last 16 of a PDC event for the first time in June at the fifth Players Championship where he was beaten 6–3 by Terry Jenkins. At the Dutch Darts Masters, he saw off established players Mark Walsh and Dave Chisnall, before Brendan Dolan eliminated Pallett in the third round.

In the beginning of the 2014 season, Pallett threw a nine-dart finish at the third UK Open Qualifier. He entered the UK Open itself at the second round stage and defeated Gary Spedding and Kevin McDine to reach the last 32 where Gary Anderson won 9–5. Pallett defeated Jamie Lewis and Andy Hamilton at the German Darts Masters, before reigning world champion Michael van Gerwen eliminated him 6–4 in the third round. Two more last 16 appearances in Players Championship events followed which contributed to Pallett earning £11,750 during the year on the Pro Tour Order of Merit, which saw him make his debut at the 2015 World Championship by taking the 11th of 16 places that were on offer to non-qualified players. Pallett played two-time winner of the event Adrian Lewis in the first round and took out a 161 finish in the first leg, but lost each set by three legs to one in a 3–0 defeat. He moved to world number 48 after the event.

At the 2015 UK Open, Pallett defeated Mark Dudbridge, Andy Smith and Colin Fowler to play in the fourth round of the event for the second year in a row. He faced Phil Taylor and was beaten 9–3. In September, Pallett averaged over 100 in knocking out both Jamie Caven (100.73) and Jelle Klaasen (104.83) at the European Darts Matchplay. His run continued with 6–5 wins over Alan Norris and Kim Huybrechts to reach the semi-finals of a PDC event for the first time, where he lost 6–3 to Dave Chisnall. This result was a huge factor in Pallett qualifying for his second successive World Championship, where he will play Huybrechts in the first round.

Pallett missed two darts to take a 2–1 set lead over Kim Huybrechts in the first round of the 2016 World Championship. However, after Huybrehcts took the opening leg of the fourth set, Pallett reeled off six straight legs to win 3–2, which included 132 and 122 finishes in the last two games. In the second round both Pallett and Mensur Suljović missed darts at doubles for nine-dart finishes. There was never more than a set between the players, with Suljović taking the final set by three legs to one. He reached the quarter-finals of the first UK Open Qualifier and lost 6–2 to Phil Taylor. His third round match with Raymond van Barneveld at the UK Open went to a deciding leg in which the Dutchman threw an 11 darter to win 9–8. It was a tough rest of the year for Pallett, but he did reach the last 16 twice towards the end of it, losing 6–3 to Steve West at the 18th Players Championship event and 6–4 to Mensur Suljović at the German Darts Championship.

Pallett regained his PDC Tour Card in January 2019 via the Order of Merit, sealing at least two years on the ProTour.

World Championship results

PDC
 2015: First round (lost to Adrian Lewis 0–3)
 2016: Second round (lost to Mensur Suljović 3–4)

WDF
 2023:

References

External links

1990 births
Living people
Professional Darts Corporation former tour card holders
English darts players
People from Newport, Shropshire